Arachchige Manjula Nishantha Munasinghe (born 10 December 1971), best known as Manjula Munasinghe, is a Sri Lankan Australian cricket coach and former cricketer who played five One Day Internationals (ODIs) between 1994 and 1996. He currently lives in Australia.

Domestic career
Born in Colombo, Munasinghe made his first-class debut for the Sinhalese Sports Club during the 1990–91 season. He first played for Sri Lanka "A" during the 1992–93 season in a quadrangular tournament also involving Bangladesh "A", India "A", and Pakistan "A".

Munasinghe did not play for Sri Lanka, but remained active domestically until the 1997–98 season. His best first-class bowling figures came in February 1994, when he took 9/38 in the first innings of Western Province North's match against Central Province.

International career
Munasinghe made his ODI debut for the Sri Lankan national cricket team during the 1994 edition of the Austral-Asia Cup in the United Arab Emirates, playing a single match. He did not play internationally again until the 1995–96 Benson & Hedges World Series Cup, held in Australia, where he played four matches as a right-arm fast bowler.

After cricket
After the conclusion of his playing career, Munasinghe emigrated to Melbourne, Australia, firstly working with the Victorian Cricket Association as a junior coach. In 2006, he established the Aus–Lanka Cricket Academy in Rowville which was intended to provide cricket coaching for children of immigrants.

References

1971 births
Basnahira North cricketers
Basnahira South cricketers
Living people
Cricketers from Colombo
Sinhalese Sports Club cricketers
Sri Lankan cricket coaches
Sri Lankan cricketers
Sri Lankan emigrants to Australia
Sri Lanka One Day International cricketers
Australian cricket coaches